Ko Po Tsuen or Ko Po Village, is the name of several villages in Hong Kong:

 Ko Po Tsuen, North District, in Kwan Tei, Fanling, North District
 Ko Po Tsuen, Yuen Long District, in Kam Tin, Yuen Long District